Trichophaeopsis is a genus of fungi in the family Pyronemataceae.

References

External links
Index Fungorum

Pyronemataceae
Pezizales genera